The 2016 Chattanooga Mocs football team represented the University of Tennessee at Chattanooga in the 2016 NCAA Division I FCS football season as a member of the Southern Conference (SoCon). The Mocs were led by eighth-year head coach Russ Huesman and played their home games at Finley Stadium in Chattanooga, Tennessee. They finished the season 9–4 overall and 6–2 in SoCon play to tie for second place. They received an at-large bid to the NCAA Division I Football Championship playoffs, where they defeated Weber State in the first round before losing to Sam Houston State in the second round.

Schedule

Game summaries

Shorter

at Presbyterian

at Furman

Samford

at East Tennessee State

Mercer

at The Citadel

VMI

at Western Carolina

Wofford

at Alabama

FCS Playoffs

First Round–Weber State

Second Round–Sam Houston State

Ranking movements

NFL Draft Selections

References

Chattanooga
Chattanooga Mocs football seasons
Chattanooga
Chattanooga Mocs football